The Angolan Handball Cup is an annual, nationwide handball competition contested by all eligible handball clubs in the country. The cup, organized by the Angolan Handball Federation is the second most important official handball competition in Angola, following the national league.

The competition is held by knock-out rounds until the final two teams in the men's and women's categories play a single playoff match to determine the winner.

Angola Men's Handball Cup Finals

Men

Angola Women's Handball Cup Finals

Women

See also
 Angola Handball Super Cup
 Angola Men's Handball League
 Angola Women's Handball League
 Taça de Angola (football)
 Taça de Angola (basketball)
 Taça de Angola (roller hockey)

References

Handball competitions in Angola
2006 establishments in Angola